Fountain & Vine is the sixth independent CD release for singer, songwriter and actress Sara Niemietz.  Produced by W. G. Snuffy Walden, Sara Niemietz and Keb' Mo'; Fountain & Vine is an EP consisting of six original songs.

Description 
Niemietz describes her musical style as, "Popular music with a shadow of blues and the lilt of jazz!"  All of the songs on Fountain & Vine are written and performed by Niemietz, co-written with W. G. Snuffy Walden and blues musician Keb' Mo' on several songs.  The album was released with a music-video for track four, "Taxi Outside", filmed in and around the Hollywood, California, area with stage performance scenes filmed at the Club 5 Lounge in Los Angeles.

Coinciding with the publication of Fountain & Vine, a collaborative music-video was released on August 20, with Niemietz fronting Postmodern Jukebox's rendition of the Talking Heads', "This Must Be the Place" (1983), a song which appears on Postmodern Jukebox's Swipe Right for Vintage album. Niemietz performed at the Governor's Ball Emmy Awards after-party on September 20. A second collaboration video with Postmodern Jukebox, a cover of "Hey Ya!" (2003) by Outkast, earned a mention in the online version of Time magazine, and for Billboard, Malorie McCall wrote, "Niemetz effortless control and wide vocal range help bring a fullness accompanied by an old fashioned band."

Name: The Academy of Motion Picture Arts and Sciences Pickford Center is located at the corner of Fountain Avenue and Vine Street.

Musicians 

 Gordon Campbell, drums
 George Doering, guitar
 Peter Erskine, drums
 Keb' Mo', guitar
 Sara Niemietz, vocals
 Darek Oles, bass
 Tim Pierce, guitar, bass
 Matt Rollings, piano
 W.G. Snuffy Walden, guitar, piano, synths and programming
 Freddie Washington, bass

Production 
 Produced by: W.G. Snuffy Walden, Sara Niemietz with Keb Mo' ("Out of Order" and "Go With The Flow")
 Recorded at: Taylor Made Studios
 Engineering and mixing: George Landress
 Mastering: Dave Donnely (DNA Mastering)
 CD design: Kiya Wilson
 Music video:("Taxi Outside")
Director/producer: Sacha Smith 
Executive producer: Edgar Struble
Director of photography: Nick Rupp
Wardrobe: Bethany Struble
Makeup: Cherish Brook Hill
Filmed in Hollywood and the Club 5 Lounge in Los Angeles

Track listing

See also 
Sara Niemietz discography

References

External links 
 
 
 W. G. "Snuffy" Walden
 Taylor Made Studios

2015 EPs
Sara Niemietz EPs